Ajjegowdanavalase  is a village in the southern state of Karnataka, India. It is located in the Kanakapura taluk of Bangalore Rural district in Karnataka.

See also
 Bangalore Rural
 Districts of Karnataka

References

External links
 Official website Bangalore Rural District

Villages in Bangalore Rural district